Remzi Arpaci-Dusseau is a professor at the University of Wisconsin-Madison and the chair of the Computer Sciences department.
He co-leads a research group with Professor Andrea Arpaci-Dusseau.
He and Andrea have co-written a textbook on operating systems, "Operating Systems: Three Easy Pieces" (OSTEP), that is downloaded millions of times yearly and used at hundreds of institutions worldwide.
His research been cited over 15,000 times and is one of the leading experts in the area of data storage.

Education 
Arpaci-Dusseau received his Bachelor of Science at the University of Michigan, Ann Arbor in 1993, then proceeded to earn his Master's in 1996 at the University of California, Berkeley.
He later earned his Ph.D at the same institution, with a thesis titled Performance Availability for Networks of Workstations.

Honors and awards 
 Mark Weiser Award (2018)
 ACM Fellow (2020)
 AAAS Fellow (2022)
 Vilas Distinguished Achievement Professor (2022) 
 UW-Madison Chancellor's Distinguished Teaching Award (2016)
 UC Berkeley Computer Science Distinguished Alumni Award (2023)
 SACM Student's Choice Professor of the Year Award (the COW award) (2001, 2009, 2010, 2011, 2013, 2016, 2018)
 USENIX FAST Test of Time Award (2022)
 USENIX FAST Best Paper Award (2004, 2008, 2009, 2010, 2011, 2013, 2017, 2018, 2020)
 SOSP Best Paper Award (2011)

References

External links  
 Remzi Arpaci-Dusseau's Professional Website

Living people
University of Wisconsin–Madison faculty
American computer scientists
UC Berkeley College of Engineering alumni
Year of birth missing (living people)
University of Michigan College of Engineering alumni
Fellows of the Association for Computing Machinery